Nathaniel Everett Green FRAS (21 August 1823 – 10 November 1899) was an English  painter, art teacher and astronomer. He professionally painted landscapes and portraits, and also gained fame with his drawings of planets.

Born in Bristol, the son of Benjamin Holder Green (1793–1865), then a haberdasher, and Elizabeth ‘Betsey’ née Everett (1795–1837); his interest in astronomy dated from 1859 when he built a telescope for himself. He produced "soft-pencil" drawings of Mars in 1877, which were widely known. Shortly after drawing them, he was the first to suggest that canals on Mars were an optical illusion.

In 1880 he was called to Balmoral and taught art to some members of the Royal family including Queen Victoria.

He was founding member of the British Astronomical Association (BAA) and its president from 1896–1898.

Green married Elizabeth Goold in 1847. Their daughter, Anne Goold Green, married English landscape painter Laurence George Bomford.

A crater on Mars was named in his honor.

References

External links
N.E. Green biography at BAA
Description of the 1877 Mars opposition observation campaign [dead link]
"Observations of Mars, at Madeira, in August and September 1877", Memoirs of the Royal Astronomical Society, Vol. 44, p123

Obituaries
 MNRAS 60 (1900) 318
 Obs 23 (1900) 67

1823 births
1899 deaths
19th-century British astronomers
19th-century English painters
English male painters
Artists from Bristol
19th-century English male artists